Don Alex Robinson Jr (born May 20, 1995) is an American professional basketball player who last played for the Long Island Nets of the NBA G League. He played college basketball for the TCU Horned Frogs.

Early life
Born in Fort Worth, Texas to Don Alex Robinson Sr and Darla Biggs Robinson, Alex grew up in nearby Arlington, Texas.  He attended Timberview High School, where he became a basketball star for the Wolves - averaging over 23 points per game and earning All-State honors as a senior in 2014.

College career

Texas A&M
Robinson enrolled at Texas A&M University in College Station, Texas on a basketball scholarship in the summer of 2014.  As a true freshman in the 2014-2015 season, he averaged 5.2 points and 2.6 assists in 32 games, helping lead the Aggies to a 21-12 record and a berth in the 2015 NIT.

TCU
After one season at A&M, Robinson transferred to Texas Christian University in Fort Worth, where he would sit out the 2015-2016 season due to NCAA transfer rules.  He chose to wear jersey number 25, which his mother had worn while playing for the TCU women's basketball team in the 1980s.

Under new head coach Jamie Dixon, Robinson became the Horned Frogs' starting point guard as a redshirt sophomore in 2016-2017.  He averaged a team-high 5.8 assists per game, helping lead the Frogs to a 24-15 record that included an upset win over #1 Kansas in the Big 12 tournament and culminated in winning the 2017 NIT title.  Robinson recorded a double-double  with 10 points and 11 assists against Georgia Tech in the championship game at Madison Square Garden and was named to the All-Tournament team.

As a junior in 2017-2018, Robinson once again led TCU with 6.1 assists per game.  In January 2018, he set a new school and Big 12 Conference record by tallying 17 assists in a home win over Iowa State.  The Frogs finished the season with a 21-12 record, which included a berth in the 2018 NCAA tournament, the program's first in 20 years.

Early in Robinson's senior season, the Frogs won the 10th annual Diamond Head Classic held in Honolulu, Hawaii.  With 26 assists in TCU's three games, Robinson set a new tournament record and was named the event's most valuable player.

He holds school records for assists in a career, season and game.

Professional career

Canton Charge (2019–2020)
Robinson went undrafted in the 2019 NBA draft. He signed with the Canton Charge of the NBA G League for the 2019–20 season. Robinson played 22 games for the Charge, averaging 4.8 points and 2.5 assists per game.

Santa Cruz Warriors (2020)
He was traded to the Santa Cruz Warriors and played one game.

Iowa Wolves (2020)
Robinson was traded again to the Iowa Wolves and averaged 4.7 points per game in four games.

BC Vienna (2020–2021)
On October 14, 2020, Robinson signed with BC Vienna of the Austrian Basketball Superliga.

Salt Lake City Stars (2021)
In October 2021, Teague joined the Salt Lake City Stars.

Wisconsin Herd (2021–2022)
Robinson was acquired by the Wisconsin Herd of the NBA G League on December 20, 2021. Robinson was then later waived on February 8, 2022.

Fort Wayne Mad Ants (2022)
On February 22, 2022, Robinson was acquired via available player pool by the Fort Wayne Mad Ants. He was waived on March 11.

Long Island Nets (2022)
On March 18, 2022, Robinson was acquired via available player pool by the Long Island Nets. On March 30, he was waived.

ABC Fighters (2023–present) 
In February 2023, Robinson signed with the ABC Fighters of Ivory Coast to play in the 2023 BAL season.

References

External links 
TCU Horned Frogs bio
Texas A&M Aggies bio

1995 births
Living people
American men's basketball players
Basketball players from Texas
Canton Charge players
Fort Wayne Mad Ants players
Iowa Wolves players
Long Island Nets players
Point guards
Salt Lake City Stars players
Santa Cruz Warriors players
Sportspeople from Fort Worth, Texas
TCU Horned Frogs men's basketball players
Texas A&M Aggies men's basketball players
Wisconsin Herd players
ABC Fighters players